Outapi Constituency is an electoral constituency in the Omusati Region of Namibia on the border of Angola. It had 30,313 inhabitants in 2004 and 23,516 registered voters . Its district capital is the town of Outapi.

Politics
Outapi constituency is traditionally a stronghold of the South West Africa People's Organization (SWAPO) party. In the 2015 local and regional elections SWAPO candidate Fillemon Shikwambi won uncontested and became councillor after no opposition party nominated a candidate. The SWAPO candidate won the 2020 regional election by a large margin. Immanuel Shikongo obtained 8,682 votes, followed by Frans Taapopi of the Independent Patriots for Change (IPC), an opposition party formed in August 2020, with 1,094 votes.

References

Constituencies of Omusati Region
States and territories established in 1992
1992 establishments in Namibia